The 2015–16 season was Kilmarnock's third season in the Scottish Premiership and their 23rd consecutive appearance in the top flight of Scottish football. Kilmarnock also competed in the League Cup and the Scottish Cup.

Overview
Kilmarnock finished eleventh in the Scottish Premiership with 36 points. They reached the third round of the League Cup, losing to Hearts, and also reached the fifth round of the Scottish Cup, losing to Rangers. Kilmarnock rounded off the season with a 4–1 aggregate victory over Falkirk in the Premiership play-off final to secure top flight status for the 2016–17 season.

Match results

Pre-season

Scottish Premiership

Premiership play-off final

Scottish Cup

Scottish League Cup

Squad statistics
During the 2015–16 season, Kilmarnock used 31 different players in competitive games. The table below shows the number of appearances and goals scored by each player.

Source:
Note 1: League appearances and goals include play-off matches against Falkirk.
Note 2: Appearance statistics from Soccerbase.com don't include the match on 19 May against Falkirk.

Club statistics

League table

Competition Overview

Player transfers

Transfers in

Transfers out

Notes

References

Kilmarnock
Kilmarnock F.C. seasons